The  is a tramcar type formerly operated by Tokyo Metropolitan Bureau of Transportation (Toei) on the Toden Arakawa Line in Tokyo, Japan. The tramcars date from the 1950s, but were rebuilt in 1977 with new bodies. The last remaining 7000 series tramcars were withdrawn following the final day of operations on 10 June 2017.

Operations

The fleet was based at Arakawa Depot, operating on the sole remaining tram line in Tokyo, the Toden Arakawa Line.

History

The original cars were built between 1955 and 1956 by Hitachi and Nippon Sharyo. In 1977, the fleet was modernized with new bodies built by Alna Sharyo, re-using the original bogies and electrical equipment. The cars were renumbered at the same time.

In 1978, the new 7000 series design was awarded the Laurel Prize, presented annually in Japan since by the Japan Railfan Club.

The last remaining car in service, 7022, was withdrawn on 10 June 2017.

Rebuilding
Eight 7000 series cars were rebuilt as 7700 series cars during fiscal 2016, with refurbished bodies, new electrical equipment including VVVF control, and new bogies.

Fleet build details

, three vehicles were still in service. The individual car build histories are as follows.

Preserved examples
 7008, withdrawn in 2012, was moved to Haginaka Park in Ota, Tokyo in 2013.
 7011 is preserved in Ichikawa, Chiba.

References

External links

 Toden rolling stock 

Electric multiple units of Japan
Tokyo Metropolitan Bureau of Transportation
Train-related introductions in 1955
600 V DC multiple units
Hitachi multiple units
Nippon Sharyo multiple units